Wedgebill or wedge-bill is a common name for several birds and may refer to

Australian endemic birds in the genus Psophodes:
 Chiming wedgebill (Psophodes occidentalis)
 Chirruping wedgebill (Psophodes cristatus)

See also
 Cachar wedge-billed babbler
 Sikkim wedge-billed babbler
 Wedge-billed woodcreeper